Francis Dixon (2 November 1854 – 20 August 1943) was an English doctor and cricketer who played for Derbyshire in 1885.

Dixon was born at Langley in Heanor, Derbyshire. He studied medicine in Edinburgh and Glasgow and qualified as LRCP and LRCSEd in 1878, and took the LSA in 1879. He was a doctor in practice at Eastwood, Nottinghamshire in 1881. He played his one and only game for Derbyshire in the 1885 season when the team lost to Surrey. He appeared subsequently in occasional games. He played two matches for Richard Daft's XI against Leicester in 1888 and 1889 and also played for Nottingham Castle. His second first-class match was in 1891, for Mordecai Sherwin's Nottinghamshire XI against the Gentlemen of England.

Dixon was a right-handed batsman and a right-arm off-break bowler 

Dixon was medical officer of Health for Eastwood UDC and served on the committee of Nottinghamshire County Cricket Club for over 40 years.

Dixon died in Eastwood aged 88.

References

1854 births
1943 deaths
English cricketers
Derbyshire cricketers
People from Heanor
Cricketers from Derbyshire